Costislost is a Grade II listed house in the parish of Egloshayle in Cornwall, England. To the south are Costislost Plantations.
It dates to probably the 17th century, and underwent remodelling in the 18th and 19th centuries. The property was a farmhouse for centuries and belonged to the Lakeman family in the 19th century.

Today it is run as an organic retreat and nutritional health centre.

References

Houses in Cornwall
Hotels in Cornwall
Grade II listed houses
Grade II listed buildings in Cornwall